America's Courtyard: A Symbolic Integration of the Americas is an outdoor stone sculpture by husband and wife Brazilian artists Ary Perez and Denise Milan, installed outside Chicago's Adler Planetarium, in the U.S. state of Illinois.

See also
 List of public art in Chicago

References

Outdoor sculptures in Chicago
Stone sculptures in Illinois
Works by Brazilian people